Château-sur-Epte is a commune in the Eure department in northern France.

Population

See also
 Château-sur-Epte Castle
Communes of the Eure department

References

Communes of Eure